Mike Caffey (born February 17, 1993) is an American professional basketball player who currently plays for MZT Skopje of the Macedonian League. He played college basketball for Long Beach State and Long Beach State 49ers.

High school career
Caffey played high school basketball at Centennial.

College career
As a true freshman, Caffey played in all 34 games, starting two, averaging 5.9 points, 2.8 rebounds, 2.2 assists and 0.7 steals per game. As a sophomore, he started all 33 games for LBSU, averaging 32.8 minutes, 12.0 points, 4.0 rebounds, 1.4 steals and 3.8 assists per game, improving his numbers a lot. Due to his performances, he Earned a First-Team All-Big West honor. During the next two years, his numbers became better and Caffey managed to gain First-Team All-Big West honors another two times, and was a three-time first-team All-Conference pick.

Professional career
After going undrafted in the 2015 NBA draft, Caffey joined Jászberényi KSE of the Hungarian League. During his rookie professional year, Caffey averaged 15 points, 4.5 rebounds and 3.4 assists per game, and was also included to the Hungarian All-Star Game.

On September 20, 2016, he signed with Aries Trikala of the Greek Basket League. He went on to average 8.4 points, 3.2 rebounds and 3.1 assists per game.

On January 2, 2017, Caffey joined Helsinki Seagulls of the Korisliiga.

On July 12, 2020, he has signed with BC Zaporizhya of the UA SuperLeague.

On March 23, 2022, he has signed with Crailsheim Merlins of the Basketball Bundesliga.

References

External links
RealGM.com Profile
Eurobasket.com Profile
FIBA.com Profile

1993 births
Living people
American expatriate basketball people in Finland
American expatriate basketball people in Greece
American expatriate basketball people in Hungary
American men's basketball players
Aries Trikala B.C. players
Basketball players from California
Helsinki Seagulls players
Long Beach State Beach men's basketball players
Point guards